Kal Meshk (also Romanized as Kal Mashk; also known as Gol Mashk and Kalmūsht) is a village in Rabor Rural District, in the Central District of Rabor County, Kerman Province, Iran. At the 2006 census, its population was 98, in 28 families.

References 

Populated places in Rabor County